"The Dolphin's Cry" is a song by American alternative rock band Live, released on August 24, 1999, as the lead single from their fourth studio album, The Distance to Here. The song was co-produced by Jerry Harrison of Talking Heads, and features Adam Duritz of Counting Crows on backing vocals. It reached number one on the Canadian RPM Top 30 Rock Report and number two on the US Billboard Mainstream Rock chart. Internationally, "The Dolphin's Cry" peaked at number one in Iceland, number seven in Flanders, and number 10 in the Netherlands while reaching the top 50 on the Australian and New Zealand music charts.

Chart performance
In the United States "The Dolphin's Cry" reached number 78 on the Billboard Hot 100, number two on the Billboard Mainstream Rock chart and number three on the Billboard Modern Rock Tracks chart. In Canada, the song topped the RPM Top 30 Rock Report. The single also reached number one in Iceland, number seven the Flanders region of Belgium, number 10 in the Netherlands, number 25 in Australia, number 48 in New Zealand, and number 62 in the United Kingdom. In the latter country, it topped the UK Rock Chart. In Australia, the single earned a Gold certification for shipments in excess of 35,000.

Music video
The music video, directed by Martin Weisz, features the band playing in an alley as successively larger waves of water flow towards them. The other people in the alley grow more panicked as the waves get larger. Towards the end of the song, the largest wave sweeps through the alley and knocks the band down, but they get back up and resume playing.

Track listings

UK CD1
 "The Dolphin's Cry"
 "Vine Street"
 "Lakini's Juice" (Sippin on Lakini's Juice remix)

UK CD2
 "The Dolphin's Cry" (album version)
 "Sun" (loop version)
 "Turn My Head" (recorded live in Melbourne, Australia 1997)
 "The Dolphin's Cry" (video)

European CD single
 "The Dolphin's Cry" (radio edit)
 "Vine Street"

Australian and South African CD single
 "The Dolphin's Cry" (radio edit)
 "Vine Street"
 "Sun" (loop version)

Credits and personnel
Credits are lifted from the US promo CD liner notes and The Distance to Here album booklet.

Studios
 Recorded at The Site (San Rafael, California), Village Recorder (West Los Angeles), A&M Studios (Hollywood, California), and The Plant (Sausalito, California)
 Mixed at South Beach Studios (Miami Beach, Florida) and Encore Studios (Burbank, California)
 Mastered at Sterling Sound (New York City)

Live
 Ed Kowalczyk – lyrics, music, lead vocals, guitar
 Chad Taylor – lead guitar
 Patrick Dahlheimer – bass
 Chad Gracey – drums
 Live – production

Other personnel

 Jerry Harrison – production
 Gary Kurfirst – executive production
 Tom Lord-Alge – mixing
 Karl Derfler – engineering
 Doug McKean – additional engineering
 Ted Jensen – mastering
 David Sestak – management
 Peter Freedman – management
 Sagmeister Inc. – art direction
 Motoko Hada – artwork design and illustration

Charts

Weekly charts

Year-end charts

Certifications

Release history

In popular culture
This song was featured in The Sopranos episode University when Caitlin Rucker interrupts Meadow Soprano and Noah Tannenbaum kissing and was also used in the film Urban Legends: Final Cut.

References

1999 singles
1999 songs
Live (band) songs
Music videos directed by Martin Weisz
Number-one singles in Iceland
Radioactive Records singles
Song recordings produced by Jerry Harrison
Songs written by Ed Kowalczyk
Universal Music Australia singles